Berkay Yılmaz (born 28 August 1998) is a Turkish professional footballer who plays as a defender for the Turkish club Malatya Yeşilyurtspor.

Professional career
Yılmaz is a youth product of Kardemir Karabükspor, having joined their youth academy in 201. He made his professional debut for Kardemir Karabükspor in a 5–0 Süper Lig loss to Göztepe S.K. on 27 April 2018. In the summer of 2020 he transferred to Bayrampaşaspor. Unable to start due to injury, he transferred to Malatya Yeşilyurtspor on 2 February 2021.

References

External links
 
 
 

1998 births
Living people
People from Karabük
Turkish footballers
Kardemir Karabükspor footballers
Süper Lig players
TFF First League players
Association football defenders